The Best Variety Producer is an award presented annually at the Star Awards, an annual ceremony held in Singapore where the media organisation Mediacorp recognises entertainers under their employment for outstanding performances of the year.

History 
The Best Variety Producer is an award that was established in 2001.

Recipients

2000s

2010s

2020s

Multiple wins and nominations 
The following individuals have received two or more Best Variety Producer nominations (* indicates no wins):
The following individuals have won multiple Best Director awards:

References

External links

Star Awards